The Vilwadrinatha Temple is a Hindu temple in Kerala's Thiruvilwamala, which is located in the city of Thrissur. 

The principal deities of this temple are Shri Rama, the seventh incarnation of God Vishnu, and his brother, Lakshmana. This is one of the four major Shri Rama temples in Kerala. The other three are in Thriprayar, Kadavallur, and Thiruvangad. 

An idol of Shri Lakshmana is installed in this temple, which is rare in all of India. The temple is located in the center of the community of Thiruvilwamala, atop a 100-foot-high hill. Bharathappuzha, the second-largest river in Kerala, flows through the temple's northern side from around 3 kilometres away, and because the temple is situated on a hilltop, the river is visible from the temple.

Temple dress code
Men: Traditional mundus are allowed inside the Sanctum sanctorum; lungis, shirts, and vests are not permitted.

Women: sarees, set mundus, salwar kameez, skirts, and blouses are allowed.

Legend

Parashurama, the sixth avatar of God Vishnu, killed 21 Kshatriya clans with his axe in retaliation for the murder of his father, the sage Jamadagni (Jamadagni was killed by the sons of the evil king Kartavirya Arjuna, as a revenge on Parashurama who assassinated their father). After that, though, he felt bad about retaliating in such a way, so he gave all the land he had gained to the religious Brahmins. But some of them opposed Parashurama because he had killed thousands of Kshatriyas. He then created his own territory by throwing his axe into the ocean. The land came to be known as Kerala because it was filled with Kera (coconut trees). Parasurama built 108 Shiva temples, 108 Durga temples, and five Shasta temples. He then gave the land to the Brahmins and engaged himself in meditation.

Nonetheless, he was still unhappy. One day, while he was meditating, the ghosts of the Kshatriyas killed by Parashurama appeared before him and begged him to grant them redemption. They stated that if they did not receive salvation, they would pose problems for the people. He then began to pray to the god Vishnu. While he was praying, he heard a voice informing him that God Shiva had arrived at Vilwadri (the Sanskritized version of Thiruvilwamala) with his entire family and guards and that he should get there as soon as possible. Parasurama travelled immediately to Vilwadri. Shiva gave him an idol of the god Vishnu and said that he should worship it at Kailash. Parasurama found a good place nearby to put the idol so that all ghosts could have darshan. (an opportunity or occasion of seeing a holy person or the image of a deity.) 

At the same time, a sage named Amalaka, who was the son of Guru Kashyapa, did a lot of penance to please God Vishnu. According to legend, Amalaka obtained his name from eating only amla (Indian gooseberry). When he was doing penance, the devas thought he wanted to take them out of their paradise. They tried to get him to stop his penance by sending heavenly damsels and setting off explosions near him, but he remained undisturbed. When they told Kashyapa about what had happened, he said that his son didn't care about worldly pleasures. 

The asuras also arrived in succession to end Amalaka's penance. As soon as Amalaka opened his eyes, flames erupted from them. The asuras were all consumed by fire and transformed into a massive rock known as "Rakshasappara." 

Amalaka maintained his penance to please the gods. Vishnu appeared before him with his wives, Sri and Bhumi, and his bed, Ananta, as an umbrella. He expressed his desire that the god remain there forever for the sake of humanity. So, Vishnu transformed himself, together with his consorts and Ananta, into a swayambhu idol.

After both the idols were consecrated, the power of Lord Vishnu spread throughout the village. Hearing this, the asuras became again furious. They sent one of them to destroy those idols. He went in the form of a holy Brahmin. During those days, Brahmins in the temple were fed twice a day. This asura also joined them. During the daytime, he remained like a normal Brahmin, but during night time, he changed his form. After that, he began to eat the cows donated to the temple and threw their bones northwards. Thus, the place came to be known as 'moorikkunnu' (moori means cattle and kunnu means hill in Malayalam). He also ate some sleeping Brahmins. But no one knew the real killer, as there is no any carnivorous creature nearby. People thought it is any ghost who is eating the cows. Finally, the 11th day (Ekadasi) in the dark fortnight of the month of Kumbham (February–March) arrived. The asura considered that time the most suitable to fulfill his task. One midnight, after all poojas were completed and everybody slept, the asura entered the sreekovil by destroying the pillars. At that time, Lord Vishnu appeared from one of the pillar in the form of Narasimha, his fourth avatar, and killed the asura in the same manner he killed Hiranyakashipu. After hearing the thundering sound made by the asura, all people woke up and rushed to see what happened. After seeing the ferocious form of the Lord, many people fainted. Some people prostrated on the ground and chanted the names of the Lord. They did not have the courage to look upon the ferocious form of the Lord. At that time, sage Amalaka came there and chanted the names of the Lord. After that, the Lord came back to his original form, and blessed his devotees. To prevent from further attacks, some power of Lord Shiva  was also disposed in the idol, thus a concept of Lord Shankaranarayana also appeared. Even on special days associated with Lord Shiva, like Mahashivaratri, Pradosha vrata and Mondays, many people visit Thiruvilwamala Temple.

Temple structure

The temple is situated on the exact centre of Thiruvilwamala village, situated on the top of a hill 100 ft above the sea level. On every side except the east, there is some population. The main gate to the temple is from the west. There are more than 50 steps to reach the temple. Bharathappuzha, one of the major rivers in Kerala, flows 3 km away from the temple on the north side, and as the temple is situated on the top of a hill, the river can be clearly seen while looking downwards from the temple. On the west and east sides, there are remains of two huge gopurams, which once got destroyed under mysterious circumstances. There are two idols of Garuda, the mount of Lord Vishnu, on both sides of the main gate. There are many trees on the surroundings of the temple, providing fresh air and lush greenery to the atmosphere. Saraswathikund, the place where sage Amalaka is believed to have did his penance, is to the south of the fleet of steps on the west nada. The place got this name because there is a pit here with presence of Goddess Saraswati. There is a huge peepal tree here, and devotees write 'Om Harisree Ganapathaye Namah', the famous mantra chanted during Vidyarambham ceremony, and after that make models of many buildings arranging various stones, bricks, sand and clay. Ramanchira, a small pond, is situated near the entrance to the west nada. Devaswom rest house and cloak room are situated near them. There is no kodimaram (flag staff) in this temple. The circumbulation path is carved with stone. There are two 'aanakkottils' on both the western and eastern sides, both recently built. On the northern side,  there is a large pond named 'Bhagavathichira', and there are steps proceeding to it. It is in this pond that the priests and devotees take bath before entering the temple. It was under a very pathetic condition for many years, and it was cleaned by devotees and devaswom in 2015. On the north-eastern side, there is a small well, which was also once having the size of Bhagavathichira, and was named 'Nairchira'. It is from this well that the water for daily poojas is taken.

Inside the nalambalam (inner temple), there are two double-storied square-shaped sreekovils of equal size and importance, situated adjacent to, but opposing each other. According to the legends mentioned here (and in reality), both consist the idols of Lord Vishnu, in standing posture holding a Shankha (Conch), Chakra (Wheel), Gada (Club and a lotus in his four arms. But, the popular belief is that the idol in the west facing sreekovil is that of Lord Rama, and that in the east facing sreekovil is that of Lord Lakshmana. As both deities have equal importance, poojas and offerings are done in the same way in both sreekovils. But some people say that the eastern sreekovil has more importance, and some others say that the western sreekovil has more importance. It is also believed that worshipping eastern sreekovil first results in salvation, and worshipping western sreekovil first results in material pleasure. Anyway, both have equal importance. There is no 'namaskara mandapam' (prostration hall) in front of both sreekovils. In both sreekovils, the idols are installed in the third room. There are no special decorations on the walls of the sreekovils.

The idol of Lord Rama in the west facing shrine is a swayambhu (self-born) image, that means no human intervention has ever taken place. This is the only temple in Kerala where Lord Rama has a swayambhu image. It is around 5 ft tall, and made up of a rare kind of stone, called 'Pathalanjana Sila'. On the top of the idol, Ananta lies as an umbrella. On each side of the idol, Sri and Bhumi devis are also consecrated. Thus, it is clear that this is the form of the Lord in which sage Amalaka is believed to have got darshan. As there is a slight presence of Lord Shiva also in this idol, a lamp is always burnt on the back, thus called 'Pinvilakku'.

The idol of Lord Lakshamana in the east facing shrine is around 3 ft tall. This is one of the rare shrines in India where this brother-cum-companion of Lord Rama is constructed. This idol is around 3 ft tall, and it is also made up of 'Pathalanjana Sila'. There are no special decorations on this idol, unlike that in the west nada. This is considered to be the older one of two sreekovils. As the west nada has an idol in the form in which sage Amalaka is believed to have got darshan, this is considered to be the idol consecrated by Lord Parasurama for the welfare of the ghosts. Both deities have separate priests.

There are two vathilmadams (raised platform) on both sides of the western entrance. On the north-western corner of the nalambalam, there is a store room and a dark room. There was a 'Koothambalam' on the south-eastern side, where, as the name suggests, the temple art forms like Koothu and Koodiyattam were conducted in olden days. Near the Koothambalam is the Thidappally (temple kitchen), where food offerings are made. On the south-western side, Lord Ganapathi is installed facing east, as seen in almost all Kerala temples. For the blessings of Lord Ganapathi for removing obstacles, Ganapathi Homam is performed here daily in the morning.

Unlike many temples, there are three balikkallus (altar stone) here. One is on the west nada, and the other two are on the east nada at different locations. There is balikkalppura on west nada. The balikkallu on the west nada is huge in size. Outside the nalambalam, on the south-eastern side, is the shrine of Lord Hanuman. Here, the monkey God resides as a gatekeeper of the temple, and has his own importance. The legend says that after killing the asura who tried to destroy the temple, the remaining asuras came to Vilwadri, and began to attack the temple far away from it, as they could not approach the temple. But, for preventing their attack, Lord Rama sent his faithful servant to Vilwadri, and after preventing attacks, he resided there permanently for preventing further attacks. The idol is around 5 ft tall, and is in sitting posture. There is another store room near Lord Hanuman temple, and also a stage for various entertainment programmes as part of temple festival. On the southern side, there is a shrine dedicated to Lord Ayyappa, here called 'Kundil Ayyappan', as the shrine is situated on a pit (called 'kundu' in Malayalam) 50 ft below the main temple. Here, Lord Ayyappa resides with his father Lord Shiva and his consort, Goddess Parvati, all facing east. It is from this temple that Lord Vilwadrinatha gets his rice for 'Thripputhari' in the month of Karkkadakam (July–August). There are shrines dedicated to serpent Gods and Brahmarakshass near Lord Ayyappa shrine. Another fleet of steps starts from here, and by going there, we can reach 'Rakshasappara'. Below it is the Parakkottukavu Temple, a famous temple dedicated to Goddess Bhadrakali. The 'thalappoli' in the month of Medam (April–May) is the main festival there. It is believed that Goddess Sita lived there after getting away from Ayodhya, and once she heard that Lord Rama has reached there, she jumped into the nearby pond, which had kept its 'mouth' open. That pond is now called as 'Vaikattichira' (meaning 'the pond which showed its mouth'). Later, a temple appeared there. The temple is constructed facing east towards Vaikattichira.

There was a huge banyan tree on the south-western side, with the presence of all deities, especially Lord Guruvayoorappan (another form of Lord Vishnu, also considered to be Lord Krishna), the major deity of the world-famous Guruvayoor Temple, situated 50 km away from Thiruvilwamala towards the south-west. One of its branches broke down on 25 June 2015 after heavy rains, and destroyed the south-western portion of the nalambalam. As the incident occurred after the nada was closed, no danger occurred. Later, it was destroyed. Now, a new banyan plant is planted on the place of this tree. There are idols of various Hindu gods below this plant.

Outside the temple complex, on the eastern side, there is a huge peepal tree. It is a wonderful sight for the devotees, as there is no soil on that place, and still this tree grew up. That point of the hill is called 'Bhoothanmala', meaning 'the hill of the ghosts'. The way to the famous Punarjani cave starts from here. This cave is situated 2 km away from the main temple towards the south-east. This is believed to have been built by Vishwakarma, the divine architect, on request of Brihaspati. Humans can enter this cave only on one day in a year - The 11th day (Ekadasi) in the bright fortnight in the month of Vrischikam (November–December), that is Guruvayoor Ekadasi. All other days are meant for ghosts.

It is believed that the bottom of the temple is also a cave, and a golden vilwa tree exists there, and thus the place came to be known as 'Thiruvilwamala'. There are even some incidents which proved this. One among them is like this: There was a large hole in front of the idol of Lord Rama. The water taken from it was given as 'theertham' to the devotees. One day, a plantain which was to be offered to the Lord fell into this hole. The priest thought that the water has become impure, and thus he tried to take plantain with a writing nail, but at that time, he heard the sound of breaking rocks, and the water was also dried up.

History
In the early days, the temple was under the control of five Moosad families (only there are three Moosad families still existing in modern days are Kandanath illam, Changanath illam, Vavath illam and rest of two moosad families are not existing Kizhakkillath illam and Kandangath illam) called 'Parasudayavar'. They came to be called so because it is believed that Lord Parasurama gave their right to control the temple with his axe (called parasu in Sanskrit). The eldest of the six administered and others assisted him. Whoever received this status gave up his relationship with his family and continued to reside in the temple itself. The Parasu-utayavar and 'Samudaya' appointed by the "Ooraymas"1 and "Karanmas"2 took up the administration of the temple. The Mahayogam (great conference) including the Ooraymas and the Karanmas and other representatives of the temple used to be held twice a year, one on the 'Dwadasi' before the new moon day in the month of Medam (March–April) and the other on the tenth of Karkitakam (June–July). The Parasu-utayavar was all powerful and was empowered to inflict any punishment including death sentence in the temple area. In Kali era 3493 the king Cheraman Perumal gave over the temple land to the Perumpadappuswarupam. It is seen that the Perumpadappuswarupam enlarged the area of land under the temple and entrusted the administration to the very same body, that is the 'Great conference' or 'Mahayoga'.

During those days, there were two huge Gopurams on the western and eastern sides, both seven-storied, but in clear Kerala style of architecture. Scenes from various puranas were depicted on them beautifully, and people came from many parts of the world to see them. A special kind of lamp was always kept burnt on these gopurams. It is believed that they could be clearly seen even from the peepal tree in front of Thirunavaya Temple, another famous temple on the banks of Bharathappuzha, situated 68 km from Thiruvilwamala, as there were no huge buildings then. One day, when the priests were sleeping after performing daily poojas, a person came in their dreams and told like this: 'Hey Mr., why these lamps are kept burnt here? Because, they can be seen from Thirunavaya Temple. It is auspicious to worship both temples on the same day. If you don't believe it, please go there'. The next day, the priests told their dream about parasudayavars, and they immediately went to Thirunavaya by taking a boat. After worshipping Lord Navamakunda (Vishnu), they went to the peepal tree. Then, they saw both lights burning at the eastern end (Thirunavaya is to the north-west side of Thiruvilwamala). But, on the next day, both gopurams became pierced to two by a huge thunderstorm. An Ashtamangalya Prasnam was conducted later, which proved that the Lord wants his devotees directly coming to Thiruvilwamala, and not looking from Thirunavaya. Thus, both gopurams were never renovated. Now, only basement can be seen.

Later, the temple came under the Zamorins (Samoothiri) of Kozhikode. During those days, the Ushapooja was in the name of Kollengode Valiya Thampuratti, Uchapooja on the name of the King of Kochi and Athazhapooja under the Zamorin. Many litres of Palpayasam were offered by the Zamorin. Later, the King of Kochi took the charge, after continuous revolts with the Zamorins. Once, Tipu Sultan came to attack the temple, but left the place because he knew that the place was under the control of the King of Kochi, who was close to him.  Once, the Lord had many huge wealth in the form of gold coins, paddy fields and other plantations. Many of them were lost after the Land Reforms Act of 1970.

The temple had got burnt thrice. One occurred in 1827, and it was after that the golaka was made for the Lord. The next two were in 1861. After the first fire, there occurred plans to renovate the temple, but before that day, it again got burnt. The eastern sreekovil did not have any problem, and the idol was taken out of it, to get poojas. The western sreekovil got burnt completely, but the idol did not have any damage. The current temple was built in 1883 by the King of Kochi. Now, the temple is administered by Cochin Devaswom Board.

Punarjani Guha
This is a 150 m long natural tunnel, situated in Bhoothanmala around 2 km away from the temple towards the south-east. This is one of the major attractions of Thiruvilwamala, but human beings are allowed to enter only on Guruvayoor Ekadasi day. Still, we can go near it and take photos.

The legend behind this cave is as follows: Even though the ghosts got the darshan of the Lord, they did not get salvation. Lord Parasurama again got sad. He went to Brihaspati, the guru of devas, for a remedy. Brihaspati told that as the ghosts achieved many births due to their karma (action), they will not get salvation. So, Lord Parasurama called Vishwakarma, the divine architect. He came with Indra and Brihaspati. As the place for ghosts should not be near the temple, they found a suitable place some point away from the temple. There, Vishwakarma detected the presence of Trimurtis (Brahma, Vishnu & Shiva), and Brihaspati began to conduct poojas. At that time, Lord Parasurama constructed a tank named 'Ganapathi Theertham' on the starting. Within the time the construction was completed, he built two more tanks, namely 'Papanasini' and 'Pathala Theertham'. Indra constructed 'Ambutheertham' with his arrows and Airavata, his vehicle, constructed 'Kombutheertham' with his tusks. The ghosts entered through the cave and got salvation.

At the same time, some Brahmins also arrived there, and expressed their wish to crawl. But, Lord Parasurama told them that even though humans can also do this, it should be only on one day- the 11th day (Ekadasi) in the month of Vrischikam, and other days are for ghosts. As the Brahmins reached there on that day, and had conducted all rituals, they crawled through the cave, and got salvation.

There is a story based on Mahabharata related to this cave. Pandavas reached here and crawled through the cave. They came here for performing vedic rituals for their ancestors, and also some relatives who were killed in the Kurukshetra war. They did 'tarpanam' and other rituals, and also consecrated many temples nearby. They include Ivor Madom Temple in Pambady (Not to be confused with the place with the same name in Kottayam district), housing Lord Krishna (The word 'Ivor/Aivar' means 'five persons', and the name came so because it was consecrated by the five Pandavas), Kothakurissi & Someswaram temples housing Lord Shiva, etc.

For the famous 'noozhal' (crawling) festival, which coincides with Guruvayoor Ekadasi, one has to follow strict rituals. The devotees should conduct fast and remain in the temple on the previous day. At 4'o clock on Ekadasi day, the priests open the temple after having a bath in Bhagavathichira, and start some poojas at the entrance of the cave. After the darshan, one has to proceed to Ganapathi Theertham, and to take bath there. Later, the devotees should take bath in Papanasini (Not to be confused with the river with the same name at Thirunelli), Pathala Theertham, Ambutheertham and Kombutheertham in that order, and should enter the cave without drying up. The starting point of the cave is around 6 ft in height, and normal persons can go there without any problem. Later, one has to bend their heads. Some more point further, one has to sit and travel. Again some more point further, the real crawling starts. At some points, there is no air and light, and a person has to seek the help of those in the front and back. Finally, after climbing some steps, a person enters outside, and again goes to Papanasini for bathing. Normal persons cannot do this, as it needs both extreme devotion and willpower. In spite of this huge darkness and location, it is a wonder that there are no ferocious animals and reptiles here, and no one has died ever inside the cave. Only men are allowed to do this.

After the massive fire in 1861, a similar cave also appeared on the west nada. Some people tried to explore this cave, but the attempts were stopped because of unending fleet of steps, and huge darkness. It is also believed that there is a hidden pathway in the temple which leads us to Thirunelli Temple in Wayanad district.

Daily pooja timings
There are five poojas and three seevelis daily in Thiruvilwamala temple. The temple opens at 4 AM, in a peaceful and auspicious atmosphere made by blowing conch seven times. The first darshan on the day is called 'Nirmalya Darshanam', that means the darshan with the decorations of the previous day. After removing those decorations, Shankhabhishekam (A special abhishekam conducted by taking holy water on rightward conch) and other abhishekams are conducted. Then the idols are decorated with new clothes and sandal paste. The first offering of the day is 'Malar' (puffed rice), along with a plantain and jaggery. After this, the nada closes for Ushapooja (Morning pooja). Neypayasam (Ghee pudding) is offered for this pooja. During sunrise, Ethirettupooja and Mahaganapathy Homam are performed. During Ethirettupooja, the sub-deities of the temple (Lords Ganapathi, Hanuman, Shiva, Parvati & Ayyappa) also get food offerings. After this starts the morning seeveli. The concept of seeveli in Kerala temples is that the Lord watches offering food to his bodyguards, represented by each balikkallu on the side. There are three circumbulations (pradakshinams) for seeveli, and after draping food on the big balikkallu, seeveli ends. No one should enter nalambalam during seeveli and should circumbulate with the Lord chanting his names. After seeveli, at 7:30 AM starts 'Navakabhishekam' (Abhishekam with the water in nine pots). After this, the idol is again decorated and at 8 AM, when the shadow reaches 12 ft height, 'Pantheeradi Pooja' is conducted. Vella Nivedyam (Rice cooked without jaggery) is offered at this time. Later, at 11 AM, Uchapooja (Noon pooja) starts. Palpayasam (Milk pudding) is offered to the Lords at this time. After Uchapooja, there is Uchaseeveli too. The temple closes at 12 PM after all rituals.

The temple reopens at 5 PM. Deeparadhana is conducted at the dusk according to the sunset of each day. During Deeparadhana, a special act called 'Sandhyavela' is also performed by the devotees, who chant the names of the Lord many times. At 7:30 PM, Athazhapooja (Night/dinner pooja) is conducted. Appam, Ada and Betel leaves are offered to the Lords at this time. Later, Athazhaseeveli is also conducted. After this seeveli, the final darshan called 'Thrippuka', in which the sreekovil is filled with holy smoke (The name itself has that meaning), is conducted. The temple closes at 9 PM.

Peruvanam Kunnath Kizhakkedath & Padinjaredath Bhattathiris are the Tantris (Chief priests) of east & west sreekovils respectively. Namboothiris from five illams are Melsanthis (Head priests).

Darshan
A devotee coming from the west nada should not enter directly into the nalambalam. First, the devotee can take a bath or wash their feet in the temple ponds, and after reaching the temple, they should worship Lord Rama from outside. Later, they should proceed to the east nada via north nada. At that time, while reaching north west, they have to worship Lord Navamukunda. They should worship Lord Hanuman before going into the nalambalam. Only with his permission can they go into the nalambalam. After worshipping Lord Lakshmana, they should proceed to the Lord Ganapathi shrine. Then only they can worship Lord Rama. After that, they should circumambulate both sreekovils. Then they can exit.

After coming out of the nalambalam, one has to proceed to Lord Ayyappa shrine. After worshipping the Lord, who resides here with Lord Shiva and his consort, Goddess Parvati, serpent gods and Brahmarakshass, they should worship the peepal plant with the presence of many deities. After that, they should turn to the south-east for worshipping Lord Muruga at Palani and south-west for worshipping Lords Wadakkumnathan and Guruvayoorappan. Then, they should proceed to Saraswathikundu, and after worshipping Goddess Saraswati, should write Harisree beneath the peepal tree standing there. Finally, they should arrange some stones together, as a symbol of three acts - Bathing in the holy river Ganga, circumbulating the mountain and visiting almighty. Thus, a darshan is completed.

Main offerings
Palpayasam, Udayasthamana Pooja, Sankhabhishekam, Sahasranamarchana, etc. are the main offerings for the main deities. Lord Hanuman's main offering is Avil (beaten rice). Mahaganapathy Homam  is the main offering to Lord Ganapathi. Lord Ayyappa has Neerajanam and Neyyabhishekam as his main offerings.

Location
The temple is situated around 50 km from Thrissur, the district headquarters, and 35 km from Palakkad. There are bus services from both cities. It is 25 km away from Wadakkanchery, the Taluk headquarters. The nearest railway station is at Lakkidi, just on the opposite bank of Bharathappuzha, but the major railway stations nearby are at Ottappalam (14 km), Shoranur (20 km) and Wadakkanchery (25 km). The area is under the control of Pazhayannur police station, and Thiruvilwamala revenue village.

References 

Hindu temples in Thrissur district
Rama temples
Temples in Kerala
Religious buildings and structures in Kerala